is a Japanese football player for Tokushima Vortis.

Club statistics
Updated to end of 2018 season.

References

External links

Profile at Mito HollyHock

1992 births
Living people
Ryutsu Keizai University alumni
Association football people from Ibaraki Prefecture
Japanese footballers
J2 League players
Mito HollyHock players
Tokushima Vortis players
Association football defenders